Asian Highway 140  is a highway that is part of Asian Highway Network. It was never signposted in Malaysia, although it is part of Asian Highway Network. It follows Butterworth–Kulim Expressway and Malaysia Federal Route 4.

Asian Highway Network